"Twisted Transistor" is a song written and recorded by American nu metal band Korn for their seventh studio album, See You on the Other Side. It was released as the album's first single in September 2005.

Music and structure
This is the first Korn single as a quartet without former guitarist Brian Welch who departed the group in 2005. The song introduces a clear change in direction for the band, embracing a more pop-tinged, bouncy sound, free of most of lead singer Jonathan Davis's throaty rage that characterized the group's previous albums, while guitarist Brian Welch's pummeling, seven-string guitar riffs are replaced entirely with James "Munky" Shaffer's simplistic power chords and a more hook-heavy, catchy chorus.

A sample previously implemented on Coil and Danny Hyde's remix of Nine Inch Nails' "Closer", can be heard at the end of the bridge section of "Twisted Transistor".

Concept

Chart performance
The song has become Korn's second most successful single to date on the Billboard Hot 100, reaching number sixty-four, and became their highest charting single on Billboard's Mainstream Rock Songs chart, peaking at number three, until it was surpassed by "Never Never," which reached number one in 2013. Its success was continued overseas, where it charted in many countries, including number twenty-seven in the UK, number twenty-four in Australia, and number six in Finland.

Charts

Music video
The video for the song was directed by Ryan Ratajski and features a Spinal Tap-esque mockumentary produced by "documentary filmmaker Rob Piner" (a reference to Canadian music journalist Nardwuar the Human Serviette)  where four rappers play the parts of Korn: Lil Jon as Jonathan Davis, Xzibit as Fieldy, David Banner as David Silveria, and Snoop Dogg as James Shaffer. The real Korn appears at the end of the video as representatives of "Fony Music", complaining about how the music video isn't going to sell because it lacks "bling-bling" and "booty shakin'". There is also a section in the video featuring 'Jonathan' recording vocals in "Big Rick's Studio", a reference to metal and hip-hop producer Rick Rubin, as Big Rick himself as he appears in the video bears a resemblance to Rick Rubin.

The rappers have jokingly noted in interviews that "It might be a [new] band coming towards you".

Track listing

UK release
7" VUS316, CD VUSCD316
"Twisted Transistor" (radio edit)
"Too Late I'm Dead"

Australian release
CD 3474592
"Twisted Transistor" (radio edit)
"Appears"
"Twisted Transistor" (Kupper's Elektro-tek radio edit)

US promotional release
12" VUSTDJ316
"Twisted Transistor" (Dummies Club Mix)
"Twisted Transistor" (album version)
"Twisted Transistor" (Kupper's Elektro-tek Klub Mix)
"Twisted Transistor" (Josh Harris Fuck the Club Mix)

References

2005 singles
Korn songs
2005 songs
Music videos directed by Dave Meyers (director)
Songs written by Reginald Arvizu
Songs written by Lauren Christy
Songs written by Jonathan Davis
Songs written by Graham Edwards (musician)
Songs written by James Shaffer
Songs written by David Silveria
Songs written by Scott Spock
Virgin Records singles
Song recordings produced by the Matrix (production team)